Luck egalitarianism is a view about distributive justice espoused by a variety of egalitarian and other political philosophers. According to this view, justice demands that variations in how well-off people are should be wholly determined by the responsible choices people make and not by differences in their unchosen circumstances. This expresses the intuition that it is a bad thing for some people to be worse off than others through no fault of their own.

Theory

Origins 
Theories of luck egalitarianism were foreshadowed by 20th-century philosopher John Rawls’ theory of distributive justice in which he observed that a person’s skills and abilities led to differential distributive justice outcomes. Rawls argued that this is unfair because one’s natural talents or circumstances are morally arbitrary as they have been determined by a “natural lottery” rather than one's own choices. This concern influenced later egalitarians theories of justice, of which, Ronald Dworkin's theory of equality of resources is considered to be the first with clearly luck egalitarian features, although he rejected the label himself. Following Dworkin, Richard Arneson's equality of opportunity for welfare theory and Gerald Cohen's equal access to advantage theory were two of the most prominent early luck egalitarian theories.

Basic principles 
Luck egalitarians therefore distinguish between outcomes that are the result of brute luck (e.g. misfortunes in genetic makeup, or being struck by a bolt of lightning) and those that are the consequence of conscious options (such as career choice or fair gambles). Luck egalitarianism is intended as a fundamental normative idea that might guide our thinking about justice rather than as an immediate policy prescription. The idea has its origin in John Rawls' thought that distributive shares should not be influenced by arbitrary factors. Luck egalitarians disagree among themselves about the proper way to measure how well off people are (for instance, whether we should measure material wealth, psychological happiness or some other factor) and the related issue of how to assess the value of their resources.

Criticism

The position is controversial within some currents of egalitarian thought, and the philosopher Elizabeth S. Anderson has been a vocal critic of it — on the ground that, amongst other things, the fact that something is chosen does not necessarily make it acceptable. An example of this would be a robber offering someone the choice "Your money or your life," which choice some theorists, including Thomas Hobbes (Leviathan XIV: "Covenants Extorted by Feare are Valide") have regarded as presumptively binding. She also claims that luck egalitarianism expresses a demeaning pity towards the disadvantaged, basing their claims to compensation not on equality but inferiority, and excludes many individuals from the social conditions of their freedom simply on the basis that it is judged to be their fault for losing them. Further, it involves the state making highly moralistic and intrusive judgements about the choices that individuals make, and seems to lead to very counter-intuitive conclusions: those who voluntarily enter jobs with higher-than-average risks, or who 'choose' to live in geographical locations prone to natural disasters may make no claim on others if they suffer as a result of it.

Susan Hurley has argued that any attempt to ground egalitarianism in issues concerning luck and responsibility must fail, because there is no non-circular way of specifying an egalitarian baseline rather than any other baseline. For instance, a luck inegalitarian could believe that the baseline from which we should correct luck is one where huge inequalities exist. Without merely assuming equality, there seems to be no way of coming to prefer one approach over the other.

Global luck egalitarianism

Global luck egalitarianism is a view about distributive justice at the global level associated with cosmopolitan moral theory. It starts from the premise that it is a bad thing for some people to be worse off than others through no fault of their own and applies this intuition across borders. Global luck egalitarians characteristically believe that moral agents may have duties to mitigate the brute luck of distant others. Proponents of this school of thought are amongst others Simon Caney and arguably Charles Beitz; opponents, most of whom reject the above premise either in its entirety or with respect to inequalities in which one party's welfare is at least above some minimum level, include Robert Nozick.

Advocates
Prominent advocates of luck egalitarianism have included Ronald Dworkin, Richard Arneson, Gerald Cohen, John Roemer, Eric Rakowski, and Kok-Chor Tan.

References

Bibliography

Further reading 
 G. A. Cohen, 'On the Currency of Egalitarian Justice', Ethics (1989), pp. 906–944.
 Richard Arneson, 'Equality and Equal Opportunity for Welfare', Philosophical Studies (1989), pp. 77–93.
 Ronald Dworkin, Sovereign Virtue (2000).
 Elizabeth S. Anderson, 'What is the Point of Equality?' Ethics  (1999), pp. 287–337.
 Susan L. Hurley, Justice, Luck and Knowledge (2003).
 Alexander Kaufman, ‘Choice, Responsibility and Equality’, Political Studies 52 (2004): 819–836.
 Alexander Brown, ‘Luck Egalitarianism and Democratic Equality’, Ethical Perspectives 12, no. 3 (2005): 293–339.
 Shlomi Segall, ‘In Solidarity with the Imprudent: A Defense of Luck Egalitarianism’, Social Theory and Practice, Vol. 33, no. 2 (April 2007).
 Kristin Voigt, ‘The Harshness Objection: Is Luck Egalitarianism Too Harsh on the Victims of Option Luck?’ Ethical Theory and Moral Practice 10 (2007): 389–407.
 Carl Knight, Luck Egalitarianism: Equality, Responsibility, and Justice (Edinburgh University Press, 2009).
 Christian Schemmel, 'On The Usefulness Of Luck Egalitarian Arguments For Global Justice', Global justice: Theory practice rhetoric (1) 2007: 54–67.
 Alexander Brown, Ronald Dworkin's Theory of Equality: Domestic and Global Perspectives (Palgrave, 2009).

External links
 BEARS Symposium on Anderson's critique of luck egalitarianism including a contribution from Richard Arneson and a reply by Anderson 

Egalitarianism
Luck